is a Japanese voice actress affiliated with 81 Produce.

Biography
Akasaki graduated from Kagoshima Prefectural Kinkōwan High School and Tokyo Gakugei University. She studied Italian as a second foreign language. She won the Nippon Cultural Broadcasting Award, 81 Produce Award and Alchemist Award on Voice Newtype Summer Audition 2008. In October 2008, she went to 81 Actor's Studio as an award privilege of 81 Produce Award. She graduated from training school in October 2009, became a member of 81 Produce in April 2010. She aspired to be a voice actress in her fifth and sixth grade. In junior high school, she belonged to the basketball club and the broadcasting club, and has a career for the tournament. At Kinkōwan High School, she belonged to the local civic troupe "Ibuki" because there was no club drama in high school.

Akasaki officially announced her marriage on her Twitter account. She gave birth to her first child (male) on August 10, 2020.

Filmography

Television
2010
 Shimajirō HESOKA – Nacchi

2011
 Shimajirō HESOKA – Ms. Shikako
 Sacred Seven – Nanami Akasaki
 Wandering Son – Tsuchiya
 Mashiroiro Symphony – Itsuki Asakura

2012
 Smile PreCure! – Haru Midorikawa, Runa Terada
 Senki Zesshō Symphogear – Yumi Itaba
 High School DxD – Ile and Nel
 Bodacious Space Pirates – Maki Harada
 Lagrange: The Flower of Rin-ne – Kokoro Sagishima, Chiharu Arisato, Yuria Sogabe, Nami Senjō
 Love, Chunibyo & Other Delusions – Shinka Nibutani

2013
 Oreshura – Chiwa Harusaki
 A Certain Scientific Railgun S – Saiai Kinuhata
 Love Lab – Natsuo Maki
 Fantasista Doll – Shimeji
 Pocket Monsters: XY – Joy, Satoshi's Numera/Numeil, Citron's Horubee
 Gingitsune – Yumi Ikegami

2014
 Kill Me Baby – Yasuna Oribe
Love, Chunibyo & Other Delusions -Heart Throb- – Shinka Nibutani
 Selector Infected WIXOSS – Akira Aoi
 Himegoto – Kaguya Arikawa
 Gonna be the Twin-Tail!! – Erina Shindō
 PriPara – Falulu, Chanko
 Trinity Seven – Ilia

2015
 Food Wars: Shokugeki no Soma – Alice Nakiri
 Is It Wrong to Try to Pick Up Girls in a Dungeon? – Mikoto Yamato
 Chivalry of a Failed Knight - Tsukuyomi Sisters
 Plastic Memories – Michiru Kinushima
 Pocket Monsters: XY&Z – Joy, Citron's Bunnelby
 Saekano: How to Raise a Boring Girlfriend – Izumi Hashima
 The Idolmaster Cinderella Girls – Akane Hino
 The Asterisk War – Ernesta Kuhne
 Utawarerumono: The False Faces – Anju

2016
 Erased – Airi Katagiri
 Food Wars! Shokugeki no Souma: The Second Plate – Alice Nakiri
 Hybrid x Heart Magias Academy Ataraxia – Yuricia Farandole
 Re:Zero − Starting Life in Another World – Felt

2017
 Fate/Apocrypha – Fiore Forvedge Yggdmillennia
 In Another World with My Smartphone – Yae Kokonoe
 Welcome to the Ballroom — Chinatsu Hiyama
 Food Wars! Shokugeki no Soma: The Third Plate – Alice Nakiri
 Little Witch Academia – Barbara Parker

2018
 Dagashi Kashi 2 – Hajime Owari
 Food Wars! Shokugeki no Souma: The Third Plate Tootsuki Ressha-ren - Alice Nakiri
 Killing Bites – Mai Shinozaki
 Sword Art Online Alternative Gun Gale Online – Miyu Shinohara/Fukaziroh
 My Sister, My Writer – Ahegao W Peace Sensei
 A Certain Magical Index III – Saiai Kinuhata

2019
 Boogiepop and Others  – Hinako
 Isekai Quartet – Felt
 Granbelm – Rosa
 Wasteful Days of High School Girls – Nozomu "Baka" Tanaka
 Is It Wrong to Try to Pick Up Girls in a Dungeon? II – Mikoto Yamato
 Outburst Dreamer Boys – Mizuki Hijiri
 Bakugan: Battle Planet – Lia Venegas
 Fruits Basket – Mitsuru (Mit-chan)

2020
 A Certain Scientific Railgun T – Saiai Kinuhata
 A Destructive God Sits Next to Me – Cerberus
 Drifting Dragons – Mayne
 Jujutsu Kaisen – Kasumi Miwa
 Bakugan: Armored Alliance – Lia Venegas

2021
How Not to Summon a Demon Lord Ω – Fanis Laminitus
Scarlet Nexus –  Luka Travers
Remake Our Life! – Sayuri Jishoji
Fushigi Dagashiya Zenitendō – Yōko Segawa

2022
Utawarerumono: Mask of Truth – Anju

2023
 In Another World with My Smartphone 2nd Season – Yae Kokonoe

Original video animation (OVA) 
 Nana to Kaoru – Yukari Mutsuki
 KonoSuba Season 2 OVA – Ran
 Thus Spoke Kishibe Rohan Episode 9: The Run – Mika Hayamura
 Little Witch Academia – Barbara Parker

Original net animation (ONA) 
 Star Wars: Visions - The Ninth Jedi – Lah Kara

Films
Takanashi Rikka Kai: Gekijō-ban Chūnibyō Demo Koi ga Shitai! (2013) as Nibutani, Shinka
Little Witch Academia: The Enchanted Parade (2015) as Barbara Parker
PriPara Mi~nna no Akogare Let's Go PriPari (2016) as Falulu, Chanko
Accel World: Infinite Burst (2016) as Risa Tsukiori
Love, Chunibyo & Other Delusions! Take on Me (2018) as Nibutani, Shinka
Saekano the Movie: Finale (2019) as Izumi Hashima
The Orbital Children (2022) as Miina Misasa

Audio drama
 Watashi ga Motete Dōsunda (2015) – Shima Nishina

Video games
 Genso Suikoden: Tsumugareshi Hyakunen no Toki – Efil, Nima
 When Cicadas Cry Bonds: Kizuna – Lune-Oak
 Girl Friend Beta – Akari Amari
 JoJo's Bizarre Adventure: Eyes of Heaven (2015) – Yukako Yamagishi
 Utawarerumono: Itsuwari no Kamen (2015) – Anju
 Sword Art Online: Lost Song (2015) – Lux
 MeiQ: Labyrinth of Death (2015) – Sethia 
 Granblue Fantasy (2015) – Arriet
 THE iDOLM@STER Cinderella Girls: Starlight Stage (2015) – Akane Hino
 Kantai Collection (2016) – Zara, Pola, and Aquila
 Utawarerumono: Futari no Hakuoro (2016) – Anju
 Little Witch Academia: Chamber of Time (2017) – Barbara Parker
 Kirara Fantasia (2017) – Cesame
 Xenoblade Chronicles 2 (2017) – Kora
 Soulcalibur VI (2018) – Seong Mi-na
 Honkai: Star Rail (2021) – Asta
 Takt Op. Unmei wa Akaki Senritsu no Machi o (2023) – L'Arlésienne

Dubbing
 High Guardian Spice – Rosemary

References

External links
  
 
 

1987 births
Living people
Voice actresses from Kagoshima Prefecture
Japanese video game actresses
Japanese voice actresses
Tokyo Gakugei University alumni
21st-century Japanese actresses
81 Produce voice actors